Inequality in Hollywood refers to the various forms of discrimination and social inequality in the American media industry. There are many branches of the media industry, such as news, television, film, music, agencies, studios, to name some of the major players. In each one of these branches, there are many instances of inequality since Hollywood formed as the entertainment hub of America in the early 1900s.

People of different gender, race, and age have faced discrimination and differing opportunities since Hollywood's installation. The industry has evolved over time, but efforts are still being made today to highlight these issues and work towards making changes. Some of these responses are social movements that have been created in an effort to make changes with diversity and inclusion across the industry.

Gender inequality 

Gender inequality in Hollywood and the media is a long-established issue. It commonly refers to the difference in pay between men and women in the industry. Women have often been paid less than men. There is also a difference in opportunities available between genders and representation of each gender within the media. This is a list of how gender inequality is commonly manifested.

Pay Gap

Actors vs. Actresses 
Such problems can be seen in the wage gap between actors and actresses. A survey conducted by The New York Film Academy in 2014 found that the top ten male actors collectively made $419 million compared to the top ten actresses who made roughly $226 million collectively. A Forbes article in August 2017 listed the 30 highest-paid actors and actresses of that year. The highest-paid actor, Mark Wahlberg, made $68 million, more than 2.5 times that of the highest-paid actress that year, Emma Stone, who ranked at 15th highest paid with $26 million. The fourth highest-paid actress, Melissa McCarthy, earned $18 million, which ties with the 21st highest-paid actor, Chris Evans.. A study from the International Federation of Actors (FIA) found that the number of women who have an income under £6,000 is 14% more than men, and the number of women who have an income of £20,000 or higher is 13% less than men.

The Sony Pictures hack in 2014 revealed that Jennifer Lawrence and Amy Adams were paid less than their male co-stars for the movie American Hustle. Each actor in the film received a certain number of points that represented how much they earned from the movie. An email from a Columbia Pictures executive stated that, "The current talent deals are: O'Russell: 9%; Cooper: 9%; Bale: 9%; Renner: 9%; Lawrence: 7%; Adams: 7%." Although the two women were nominated for more Academy Awards than the men put together, Lawrence was originally presented with five “points” while the leading actress, Adams, was presented with seven. The hack also brought forth data which showed that, “Of 6,000 employees, 17 of those employees were raking in $1 million or more, but only one of those $1 million-plus employees is a woman.”

In some instances, male co-stars have offered to give up part of their salaries in order to ensure equal pay. During an interview, Susan Sarandon said that Paul Newman offered to give her part of his salary after learning that the actress was being paid less than he was. In 2018, Benedict Cumberbatch declared that he would not take on a role if his female co-star was not being paid the same rate.

Directors 
A 2017 study found that directors linked with the top 100 movies of that year were made up of 7.3% female compared to their male counterparts at 92.7%. Across an 11-year study that included 1,100 top movies, only 4.3% of the directors were female.

Writers 
Data from The Writers Guild of America, West, a union for film and television writers in Hollywood, was analyzed by Denise D. Bielby in “Sociologie du Travail.” She states that “from 1999 through 2005, the gender gap in earnings increased… with women’s earnings declining by 6% (from $53,200 to $50,000) and men’s growing by 16% (from $77,500 to $90,000).”

Representation and Opportunities 
When it comes to opportunities available for both men and women in the industry, there are mixed reports regarding opportunities. A New York Film Academy research study found that films with a female director exhibited a 10.6% increase in female characters on screen and an 8.7% increase when a female screenwriter was part of the project. The same study found that, "Visual effects, usually the largest department for big feature films, had an average of only 17.5% of women (employees), while music had just 16%, and camera and electrical were, on average, 95% male". Few film directors are women. Among the top 250 grossing films in 2016, only 7% of directors were female.

Another study from the International Federation of Actors focusing on the opportunity of employment shows that 22% more men than women reported that they feel that they have a large choice of employment opportunities and feel that they can work regularly.

Inequality in the film industry is also evident in the types of characters women portray. While men can be seen playing characters within a number of different genres, women are typically under-represented in genres such as action and sci-fi, being more commonly represented in the romance genre. The New York Film Academy 2014 poll cited above also assessed gender differences in revealing clothing on screen. The poll found that while only 30.8% of speaking characters are women, 28.8% of those women wore sexually revealing clothes compared to 7% of male speaking characters.

The Geena Davis Institute on Gender in Media is an organization that lobbies the industry to expand the roles of women in film.

A 2018 study from IndieWire found that Michelle William's performance of “All The Money In the World” made $80 a day in per diem for the film's reshoots, while co-star Mark Wahlberg got $1.5 million from Sony. Despite being significantly represented in studio executive and producer ranks, women in the industry were intensely aware that other women on the stage had been vastly underpaid.

Social Movements Surrounding Gender Inequality

#MeToo 

In October 2017, the New York Times published an article about Harvey Weinstein, highlighting the sexual harassment accounts from many of the women actresses he worked with. Following the outbreak of this story, Alyssa Milano started the now viral Twitter hashtag #MeToo to encourage other sexual harassment victims to speak up. Several film, TV, and media production figures beyond Weinstein soon became involved in a number of latent sexual harassment accusations, including news anchor Matt Lauer, comedian Louis CK, and Disney producer John Lasseter.

Investigations into Weinstein's and other high level executives’ harassment cases revealed that women actresses were threatened to perform sexual favors or be subjected to lewd, gender-based comments. Tight control over networks of power and uses of silence agreements discouraged women to speak up about their treatment. Since October 2018, the hashtag has been retweeted 19 million times and has accompanied notable company boycotts and accused figures to resign or step out of the public eye.

#TimesUp 

The Time's Up movement was a direct response to the #MeToo controversies in Hollywood, specifically to the allegations against Weinstein. The movement was notable for being galvanized and funded by other Hollywood celebrities, simultaneously establishing legal frameworks while raising awareness by having celebrities wear black to major Awards shows in 2018. This movement stretches outside of Hollywood and works to reach people around the world in whatever workplace they work in.

#AskMoreOfHim 
This movement was generated by men in Hollywood who want to show support for women in the industry by speaking up. The movement was created in response to the #MeToo movement. The men behind the movement have the goal of speaking up more about sexual harassment when it happens and holding themselves accountable to make women more equal in the industry.

Racial inequality

History of Racial Inequality in Hollywood 
The first films to come out of Hollywood that included non-white characters were played by white actors through blackface, brown-face, and yellow face in a derogatory, intellectually demeaning manner. In America, during the 1830s and 1840s, Minstrel Shows gained popularity. These shows cast white actors to represent other ethnicities. By the 1940s and 1950s, many ethnically white actors and actresses got into the spotlight by swapping out their culturally ethnic names for more widely used industry names. Oppositely this left non-white actors out of work and cast aside.

Once people of color made it onto the big screens of Hollywood by the early twentieth century, they were only granted small background roles or forced to stereotype their character to get the role. Through self-imposed restrictive laws, like “The Motion Picture Production Code, Hays code”, no interracial marriage or relationship like statutes could be portrayed on camera. This helped exclude actors of color from getting lead roles, even if their female counterpart was a character of color because it would typically be a white actress in blackface.

The Georgetown Law Journal of Modern Critical Race Perspectives published an article stating that “typically, breakdowns reserve leading roles for white actors, leaving only a small number of remaining roles for non-white actors.” A 2006 study by UCLA Chicano Studies stated that "from June 1st to August 31st of that year...only 0.5% to 8.1% of roles were available for actors of color, compared to 69% of roles 'reserved' for white actors. Moreover, only 8.5% of roles did not designate race or ethnicity, pitting white actors against actors of color". Furthermore, “Just over a quarter (25.9% ) of the 3,932 speaking characters evaluated were from underrepresented racial/ethnic groups; [74.1% were White]”

According to the Writers Guild of America's 2016 Hollywood Writer's Report, race is a bigger factor in pay disparity than gender, putting minority women-even at the top levels- at the greatest disadvantage. The report also states that white men earned a median of $133,500 in 2014, whereas women collectively made a median of $118,293 and non-white writers even less: $100,649. Although the Guild declined to provide specific data for women of color, Asian writers collectively earned a median of $115,817; black writers $99,440 and Latino writers $84,200. The median earnings for Native American writers was $152,500, but there were only five employed Native scribes in 2014.

African-American Inequality 

As Hollywood grew slowly at the beginning of the twentieth century, few roles were available for African-American actors. In 1915, the film Birth of a Nation was released, which has become known as "the most controversial film ever made in the United States." The film featured white actors in blackface, and it also portrayed the Ku Klux Klan as the saviors of society. The Jazz Singer, which was released in 1927, is another example of white actors using blackface, instead of films hiring black actors and actresses These early films influenced the early growth of racism in Hollywood.

Recognition for African American performances throughout the history of motion pictures is awarded less often. Hattie McDaniel was the first ever African American to win an Oscar, which was in 1939 for Best Actress in a Supporting Role for the film Gone with the Wind. Steve McQueen is the only black director to win an Academy Award for Best Picture, which was for the film 12 Years a Slave. Only 4 African American actors have won Oscars for Best Actor in a Leading Role, and Halle Berry is the only black actress to have won an Oscar for Best Actress in a Leading Role. Jordan Peele and Geoffrey Fletcher are the only black men to have Oscars for in the Best Writing categories, respectively. In 2010, Fletcher won for Adapted Screenplay for Precious; Peele won for Original Screenplay for the film Get Out, which was in 2018.  There is also a disparity in the budgets and box office grosses between films with white and non-white directors, with white director's budgets being higher on average.

There are other examples of racial inequality for African Americans in Hollywood beyond actors, actresses, and directors. In 2009, Disney introduced the first ever African American Princess, Tiana, in the movie The Princess and the Frog.

Asian Inequality
There have been many instances where white actors are used in place of Asian actors. In the Marvel movie Doctor Strange,  Tilda Swinton, a white actress, was cast to play the role of “the Ancient One”, a character that is presented as a Tibetan male mystic in the comics. Scarlett Johansson also received major backlash after playing the role of cyborg Motoko Kusanagi in the adaptation of the Japanese anime classic Ghost in the Shell. 

Direct discrimination to Asian Americans is also present in notable movies and TV shows such as Kung Fu. It recalled jarring memories of David Carradine from “Kung Fu,” the 1970s television series that, coincidentally, was itself a whitewashed version of a Bruce Lee concept”. There is still reportedly hidden instances where the erasure of Asians is an acceptable practice in Hollywood. Asians make up 5.7% of characters in Hollywood.  Of the top 100 films from 2015, 70 of the films had cast no female Asian actresses, and 49 of the films cast no Asian American actors at all. In addition, Asian characters have 3%-4% of roles in scripted broadcast and cable shows in the 2014–15 season. 
Notable celebrities have spoken on this issue. Michelle Yeoh recalls that someone said, "If we cast an African-American lead, there’s no way we can cast you because we can’t have two minorities”.  Famous action star Jackie Chan also stated in an interview with Steve Harvey that, “For the last 20 years I’m looking for some other things, but in the U.S it’s difficult. Always police from Hong Kong, police from China”. Constance Wu reflected on the importance of Crazy Rich Asians, the first Hollywood Studio film centered on an Asian American Character's story in over 25 years: “Our amazing director Jon M. Chu says…this is more than a movie, it’s a movement”.

A wage gap also exists between white actors and actors of color, seen in the potential reboot of "Hawaii Five-0"  where actors Daniel Dae Kim and Grace Park quit because their contracts offered 10% to 15% less pay than those of their white co-stars.

Latino Inequality 
According to Nancy Wang Yuen in her book, Reel Inequality: Hollywood Actors and Racism, the population of Latino people in the US does not reflect their representation within Hollywood. There is a huge disproportion when looking at their population in the US versus their population in major motion films and programs on TV. Although Hispanics make up 17% of the total population and are the largest population of non-whites in the US, their representation within the industry is nowhere near that. "Latinas/os were severely underrepresented in film and television in 2013. Specifically, Latinas/os represented only 5% of film speaking roles, 3% of cable television regulars, and 2% of broadcast television regulars. Latinas/os were underrepresented by a factor of more than eight to one in broadcast television. In 2014–2015, Latinas/os played only 5.8% of all speaking/named characters in film, TV, and streaming services. Chris Rock wrote, “But forget whether Hollywood is black enough. A better question is: Is Hollywood Mexican enough? You’re in L.A, you’ve got to try not to hire Mexicans."

In 2015, Gina Rodriguez became only the second Latina actor to win a lead actress Golden Globe Award when she won for Jane the Virgin. In her acceptance speech, Rodriguez said her win “represents a culture that wants to see themselves as heroes.” Even with Rodriguez's win, Latinas/os remain the lowest represented racial group compared with their percentage in the population.

"Blanca Valdez, who runs a Latina/o casting agency in Los Angeles, said that Latinas/os have a difficult time auditioning for roles unless the call specifically asks for “diversity” or “multiethnic”; in any case, most are secondary roles, such as a neighbor or a bank teller."

Yuen also highlights the lack of variation of the roles written and selected for Latino actors and actresses. This is due to Hollywood’s tendency to create, fund and promote roles that only reflect conventionalized images of Latino people. Latino actors and actresses tend to get only roles that are sourced from stereotypes of who they are typically known to be yet there’s so much more to them than these few stereotypical roles reserved for them. As a result Latino audiences don’t get to see themselves represented wholly and as broadly as they truly are outside of Hollywood.

“Puerto Rican American actor Gina Rodriguez says: I want Latinas to look at the TV and get confirmation that, yes, we are the doctors, the lawyers, the investment bankers—we encompass every facet of life. And the reason that’s important is because little kids look at the screen, as we did when we were growing up, and wonder, where do I fit in? And when you see that you fit in everywhere, you know anything is possible."

Social Movements Surrounding Racial Inequality

#OscarsSoWhite 

The #OscarsSoWhite movement began in 2015 as a push to make the Academy Awards more inclusive and racially diverse but has since sparked a critical reexamination for representation across the media industry, which includes TV, film, broadway, music, and news. The 88th Oscar nominations released in 2015 faced backlash from the public because there was only one nominee out of the main Oscar categories who was ethnically diverse and not Caucasian. The Academy received backlash from online communities, such as Twitter, along with Hollywood celebrities of every ethnicity. The hashtag has encouraged reconstruction in Academy membership, casting decisions, and behind-the-scenes staff diversity. In a research article, Caty Chattoo noted that before responding to the pushback against racial inequality, Academy membership was 92% white and 75% male in 2016. In 2017, this changed to include 41% people of color and 46% female.

Age Inequality 
Ageism is the practice of discrimination against one's age. Historically, female actresses have often faced pressure from casting directors for their ages relative to their male counterparts. Young women have often been cast with significantly older men for years. For example, “In the 1942 classic Casablanca, Ingrid Bergman, 27, played opposite Humphrey Bogart, 16 years older than her.” 

The FIA finds that 63.8% of women in the performance industry and 51.2% of men have a career that lasts between 11 and 15 years. This difference of 12.6% depicts the number of women who have ended their careers earlier than their male counterparts. Unlike other male-dominated industries, which have seen increases in female representation in the last century, motion picture participation has increased the gender gap. A study suggests that gender participation in the movie industry is highly correlated with audience expectations of characters in preferred genres such as comedy or drama. Because these characters have remained generally consistent over time since the era of Shakespearean plays, audience preferences have been fixed on certain gender and age mixes. This has also worked both ways on gender age disparity. Although there are less roles for women as their ages increase, there are less roles for young male actors. These roles are often stereotyped based on age. Public outcry related to typecasting and age has come from a range of sources, including celebrities. At the 2006 Venice Film Festival, actress Meryl Streep remarked, “What films have you seen lately with serious roles for 50 year old women in the lead? These are roles they write for women my age, usually they are sort of gorgons or dragons or in some way grotesque.”

A study in the Journal of Management Inquiry found a correlation between age, gender, and pay. The data show that “Average earnings per film of female movie stars increase until the age of 34, but decrease rapidly after that. For male movie stars, average earnings per film are highest when they are 51 years of age.” These studies show a clear bias against older actresses while the salaries of men remain fairly consistent even in their old age.

Reception of Movements in Hollywood 
After the #OscarsSoWhite movement, The Academy set goals to change its composition of members by 2020. The first goal was to double the number of women. As of 2019, the 91st Academy Awards had about 49% female voters. The other goal that the Academy set out to achieve was to double the number of diverse members. Currently, that number is at about 38% of the population of voters.

The Academy is not the only entity making changes in Hollywood inclusion. Many actors and actresses have set goals to diversify the industry through projects. Black Panther became the most successful Marvel movie of all time, breaking many records for diverse films in the industry. Other successful diverse films include Crazy Rich Asians, Hidden Figures, Get Out, Love, Simon, Moonlight and Wonder Woman

Television has also felt the effects of social movements with its programming. This is Us became the highest rated TV drama series in 2017, featuring a diverse cast working to tell the stories of all people. Grey's Anatomy is another example of a TV drama series that showcases diversity. It's the longest-running scripted primetime show to ever air on ABC, and has been one of the highest rated shows on the ABC Network consistently during that time.

Improvements in the gender pay gap are also in the works. Emma Stone reported that her male costars have volunteered to cut their salaries in the past because they felt it was fair to be paid equally.

In reaction to these developments prominent entertainment individuals have made an effort to cast and create more diversely inclusive films. Producer Jordan Peele who has expressed his support for the need of diverse Hollywood entertainment by claiming he doesn't see himself casting any white males as the lead of any of his future films. The Evolve Entertainment Fund was created in January 2018 to provide a resource for people from under-served communities to find work in the entertainment industry.

Academy Aperture 2025 is a new diversity standard for best picture nominees created by the Academy of Motion Picture Arts and Sciences that is set to begin in 2024. Deadline Hollywood described this as a "plan to require that Best Picture contenders meet at least two of four inclusion standards aimed at increasing screen depictions or employment of underrepresented groups — women, specified racial and ethnic groups, LGBTQ+ individuals, people with cognitive and physical disabilities, and those hard of hearing."

References

Lawrence, Amy. Echo and Narcissus: Women's Voices in Classical Hollywood Cinema. Berkeley:  University of California Press,  c1991 1991.

Economic inequality in the United States